is a 2003 Japanese television drama starring Takuya Kimura. The story revolves around an up-and-coming pilot, Hajime Shinkai, and portrays his interactions with others as he progresses along the road to becoming a captain. As is common in many Japanese drama series, it blends drama and romance with comedic elements. This drama also emphasizes hardship of being a pilot or a cabin crew, and the serious nature of the industry they're in, which puts thousands of lives in its hands.

Cast
Takuya Kimura as 
Shinichi Tsutsumi as 
Kō Shibasaki as 
Rina Uchiyama as 
Naoto Takenaka as 
Yasunori Danta as 
Hitomi Kuroki as 
Jun Kaname as 
Yoon Son-ha as

Key characters
 Hajime Shinkai (played by Takuya Kimura) is the protagonist. A young, inexperienced pilot who earns notoriety among colleagues for disregarding standards and standing up to superiors. Emotional and easily provokable, he has a strong sense of justice and equally strong love of flying.
 Kazuki Kouda (Shinichi Tsutsumi) is a senior captain and chief of flight operations. Known for his very cold, nearly robotic demeanour, he has not tolerance for anything but perfect professional performance to the border of inhumanity. He is feared and disliked by most of the other characters for being very unpleasant and demanding.
 Ayumi Ogawa (Kō Shibasaki), a stubborn, straight-talking mechanic who is as committed to her job as she is abrasive towards Shinkai. Having lost her parents in a plane crash, she decided to become a plane mechanic to make planes as safe as possible. However, she has profound fear of flying and has not had flown at the start of the series.
 Noriko Togashi (Kuroki Hitomi), a female chief cabin attendant, is committed to highest professional standards, but at the same time cares for her junior colleagues and compassionately coaches them.
 Ota Kenzaburo (Yasunori Danta), a senior male chief cabin attendant, who can be both very serious about his job and the performance of his staff and cheerful and humorous when interacting with pilots. He is a big fan of Shinkai and encourages him in his development, while at the same time displaying much dislike for Kouda behind his back.
 Fukaura Urara(Rina Uchiyama), a very junior flight attendant who only chose the job for its apparent glamour and ostensibly does not want to pursue this career path, but use the opportunity to find a husband quickly. She does not treat her job seriously and oftentimes behaves unprofessionally, which earns her scolding from other crew members. She is brash and cheeky when pursuing her goals, which include (the unwilling) Shinkai's affections.
 Jane Naito (Naoto Takenaka), also a (male) captain, is colourful character with a sense of humour and relaxed behaviour. A womanizer popular with cabin attendants, he has been married (and divorced) at least twice, and makes frequent advances towards female colleagues.
 Ryujiro Azumi (Shinichiro Azumi) - a (male) co-pilot.
 Shimamura Takashi (Hironari Amano), a young mechanic working together with Ayumi Ogawa, protective of her
 Ryoji Shinkai (Ikariya Chosuke) - Hajime's father, once a captain of large ships, now owns a small fishing boat business in the middle of the port of Tokyo. Wished Hajime to take over the family business and has a strained relationship with him because of him choosing to become a pilot instead.
 Makoto Shinkai (Akiyoshi Nakao) - Hajime's younger brother, a high school student, with whom Hajime frequently fights.
 Kaori Ogawa (Miwako Ichikawa) - Ayumi's good-natured sister, with whom she shares an apartment.
 Park Mi-suk (Yoon Son-ha), a Korean neighbour of Shinkai, who perplexes and embarrasses him with displays of affection, implying a relationship between them (which does not exist). Serves as a comedic relief between the more serious scenes.

Summary
The series presents the characters interacting at work and outside of it. The focus are the flight operations, with the crew characters finding themselves inflight together having to deal with some difficult or unusual occurrences, such as unruly guests, equipment malfunctions, medical emergencies and diversions. The characters have to prove themselves handling those situations, and their relationships are both put to the test and develop.

On the ground, the characters meet at All Nippon Airways main base at Narita Airport, as well as restaurants and bars and the characters and their families' homes. The series features many scenes in the outdoors, including portraying characters driving or riding a boat. Some scenes are shot actually on location at Narita, at the ANA headquarters and maintenance hangars, with ANA employees serving as extras.

Reception
Good Luck!! topped the Japanese drama ratings with 35% of the Japanese viewership in 2003.  The first episode aired on January 19, 2003 with ratings of 31.6%, the third highest ratings of an opening episode, behind Beautiful Life and HERO, also starring Takuya Kimura.

The single episode ratings are as follows:

Trivia and notes 
 World-famous ballet dancer Kumakawa Tetsuya guest stars as himself as a passenger in Episode 5

See also
Japanese television programs

References

External links
Good Luck!! Official Website (Japanese) by Tokyo Broadcasting System
Good Luck!! English fansite with episode guide, cast listing and more
Japanese Drama Database: Good Luck
 

2003 in Japanese television
Japanese drama television series
2003 Japanese television series debuts
2003 Japanese television series endings
Nichiyō Gekijō
Aviation television series
Television shows written by Yumiko Inoue